John Eskow is an American screenwriter.

Filmography
Pink Cadillac (1989)
Air America (1990)
The Mask of Zorro (1998)

Novel: Smokestack Lightning, Delacorte, 1981.

References

External links
 

American male screenwriters
Living people
Year of birth missing (living people)